British Asians in association football include British citizens with heritage or joint-nationality of any Asian country; there is a long history of British Asian football players in England particularly, dating back to the Victorian era, albeit in low numbers. In modern times the proportionately low number of British Asians in association football has received significant media attention, and has seen some clubs announce plans to explicitly target young British Asian players. Prominent British Asian players have included Frank Soo, Neil Taylor, Zesh Rehman, Jimmy Carter and Michael Chopra.

In October 2017 the BBC reported that out of 3,000 professional footballers in England, only 10 were British Asian.  In 2019, academic Daniel Kilvington suggested a figure of 10 British Asians out of a total of 4,000 professional players in the English game. By contrast, at the time of the 2011 census around 7.5% of the population of England was of Asian descent – a ratio of footballers mirroring this would be 300 out of the 4,000.

History

Players

History
The earliest documented British Asian players were the Cother brothers who appeared for Watford in the late 1890s, their father was an Indian man from Mumbai. Later in the 20th century the British Chinese players Frank Soo and Sammy Chung had prominent careers. Soo became the first ethnic minority player to represent England, albeit in Victory International matches that were not included on full senior records; he went on to have a long coaching career, particularly in Sweden where he won the Allsvenskan with Djurgardens IF in 1955. Chung played over two hundred league matches for Watford and went on to manage Wolverhampton Wanderers in the 1970s and Doncaster Rovers in the 1990s.

Roger Verdi, of Indian origin, decided to change his name because of racism, and had to move to the United States to start a professional career in 1972.

Premier League
Jimmy Carter, who had played in the Premiership in 1991, had Indian heritage and was therefore the first British Asian to play in that league. However he did not disclose his heritage, and until he did so, Zesh Rehman, of Pakistani origin, and Michael Chopra of Indian origin, were both claimed to be the first British Asians to play in the Premiership, in 2003 and 2004 respectively. Rehman later launched his own Foundation in May 2010, with the intention of helping young British Asians in football.

Modern club football
A Commission for Racial Equality survey in 2004 found only seven professional British Asian footballers playing in the UK; the same survey also found only ten British Asian players at Premier League academies. By February 2008 the number of professionals had dropped to just five, and less than 1 in 100 of young players in Academies throughout the entire English football league system were Asian. Current professionals, such as Adnan Ahmed, have publicly spoken out about the lack of fellow Asians in the sport.

Anwar Uddin, of Bangladeshi origin, was the first British Asian to captain a side in any of the top four divisions of English League football.

In 2011, British-Pakistani footballer Kashif Siddiqi founded the Kashif Siddiqi Foundation, with the aim to encourage increase the participation of British Asians in association football.

In October 2013 the Football Association announced plans to encourage an increase in British Asian players and coaches.

In December 2015, Yan Dhanda, of Indian heritage, signed a two-and-a-half-year deal with Liverpool.

On 28 November 2017, Hamza Choudhury made his Premier League debut for Leicester coming on as substitute in the 83rd minute of a home win against Tottenham Hotspur. He is the first player of Bangladeshi descent to have played in the Premier League, as well as the only Bangladeshi to currently play in the Premier League.

In February 2019, Adil Nabi said that he wanted to be an inspiration to other British Asian footballers, in the same way that Cyrille Regis and Laurie Cunningham had done for black players.

In October 2019 there were "just 12 players of South Asian heritage across the Premier League and the English Football League".

On 29 October 2020, Hamza Choudhury scored a 39th-minute volley against AEK Athens in the UEFA Europa League, becoming the first British Asian footballer to score in the Europa League.

In December 2021, Shadab Iftikhar became the first British Asian to become a senior manager in Scotland when he took charge of Fort William.

On 8 December 2021, Zidane Iqbal came on as an 89th minute substitute in Manchester United's final UEFA Champions League group stage match against BSC Young Boys to become the first ever British Asian footballer to play in a Champions League finals match, being of Pakistani and Iraqi descent.

In June 2022, Mal Benning spoke out about being a role model for South Asian players.

International football
Correct as of 2022, Neil Taylor is the only British Asian to have won full senior international caps for one of the home nations, making 43 appearances for Wales between his debut in 2010 and last match in 2019. He also represented Great Britain at the 2012 Summer Olympics.

Frank Soo, of Chinese heritage, played for the England wartime team and remains the only player of East Asian heritage to do so.

In August 2007, trials were organised by the Pakistan Football Federation in Rotherham, South Yorkshire for British Pakistanis players to attend a training camp with the Pakistan national team.

Clubs
There are a number of Asian-specific football teams such as London APSA, Sporting Khalsa and Sporting Bengal United, who became the first Asian clubs to play in the FA Cup in 2005.

In October 2007, clubs in the Football League began out-reach programmes into Asian communities to attract new fans.

In March 2009, Premier League club Chelsea announced plans to target young players from Asian communities. Two players found on the trial later signed with Southend United and Leyton Orient, and in May 2010 Chelsea launched a second initiative, with the aim to find six young British Asian players.

Fans
In December 1999, a Scottish Asian football fan publicly spoke out about the racism he had encountered at Rangers.

Research compiled by the Premier League in March 2009 concluded that more British Asians were attending games than ever before. However, research in 2013 by the BBC found that only 1% of fans of teams in the North West of England are Asian, despite making up 20% of the population of some areas.

Officials
Jarnail Singh, who is of Indian descent, has been described as a "trailblazer" for Asian referees.

In January 2023, Bhupinder Singh Gill became the first Sikh-Punjabi to serve as a Premier League assistant referee.

The Asian Football Awards
Launched to recognise the outstanding contribution to both the professional game and grass roots initiatives by individuals and groups across the UK with South Asian heritage, the awards focus on the positive efforts made in the football industry.

Organisations
The Football Association has held meetings on the matter of British Asians in association football,  and they launched a campaign in 2013 to increase British Asians in football, though in March 2014 it announced plans to increase the number of British Asians in football would be delayed. FA chairman Greg Dyke admitted in December 2014 that attempts to increase Asian participation in the sport had failed.

In January 2012 the inaugural Asian Football Awards were held.

Racism

In April 2019 British Asian footballers spoke out about the racist abuse they had encountered. In August 2019 Yan Dhanda said that the racism he has encountered as a British Asian footballer inspires him to play his best.

List of British Asian footballers

The following is a list of notable British Asian footballers – those who have participated at professional or international level – organised by ethnic heritage.

In popular culture
The 2002 film Bend It Like Beckham deals with issues relating to British Asians in football.

See also
Islam in association football

References

External links
Asian Football Awards
Asian Football Network

 
Football in the United Kingdom
Association football player non-biographical articles